Patricia Chapple Wright (born September 10, 1944) is an American primatologist, anthropologist, and conservationist. Wright is best known for her extensive study of social and family interactions of wild lemurs in Madagascar. She established the Institute for the Conservation of Tropical Environments at Stony Brook University. She worked extensively on conservation and contributed to the establishment of the Ranomafana National Park in Madagascar.

Early life
Patricia Wright was born in Doylestown, Pennsylvania, on 10 September 1944 to Julia Delores, a school librarian and Hugh Edward Chapple, a foundry supervisor.

Education
Wright obtained a bachelor's degree in biology in 1966 from Hood College. She later went on to obtain her Ph.D. in Anthropology from City University of New York in 1985 under the direction of Warren Kinzey.

Madagascar
In 1986 Wright traveled to Madagascar in search of the greater bamboo lemur  (Prolemur simus), a species abundant at the sub-fossil lemur sites of the north but believed to have gone extinct in the recent past. She found that the greater bamboo lemur still exists and discovered a new species that was named Hapalemur aureus, the golden bamboo lemur.

Centre ValBio
Patricia Wright established the Institute for the Conservation of Tropical Environments at Stony Brook University that is dedicated to science-based conservation and research in the tropics, with a special focus on Madagascar. It coordinates the work of many natural and social scientists throughout Madagascar, especially around Ranomafana National Park. It operates a modern research station in Madagascar called Centre ValBio.

Awards and recognition

Awards

 2018 – Finalist for the St Andrews Prize for the Environment
 2014 – First Woman Winner of Indianapolis Prize for Conservation
 2014 – Featured in CNN's Parts Unknown with Anthony Bourdain
 2014 – Lifetime Achievement Award from Wildlife Conservation Film Festival
 2014 – Honorary Degree (Honoris Causa) from University of Fianarantsoa, Madagascar
 2014 – Featured in 3D IMAX film Island of Lemurs: Madagascar with Morgan Freeman
 2013 – Elected to American Philosophical Society
 2012 – Awarded Commandeur Medal of Honor, Government of Madagascar
 2011 – Finalist for the Indianapolis Prize for Conservation
 2008 – Stony Brook University Faculty Achievement Award
 2008 – Hauptman Woodward Pioneer in Science Medal
 2008 – Distinguished Primatologist Award from American Society of Primatologists
 2007 – Awarded Honoris Causa, honorary degree from University of Antananarivo
 2007 – Ranomafana National Park named UNESCO World Heritage Site
 2006 – A new species from Kalambatritra, Madagascar named Lepilemur wrighaeti
 2006 – Cosmos Prize Selection Committee, Osaka, Japan
 2006 – Explorers Club Lecture Series
 2006 – 2010 Member of  Smithsonian Biodiversity Task Force
 2004 – Elected AAAS Fellow
 2004 – "Medaille Officier de Madagascar". High honor awarded by the President of Madagascar
 2003 – "Woman of Distinction" Award, given by Senator Kenneth LaValle
 2003 – -2011 Member of National Geographic Conservation Trust
 2003 – Royal Geographical Society Invited Speaker, London, United Kingdom
 2002 – James Watson Presidential Council speaker at Symposium "Human Behavior in the Genomic Age" Cold Spring Harbor, NY
 2002 – National Research Council, The National Academies Committee
 2001 – 2009-Member of National Geographic Committee for Research and Exploration
 2001 – Provost's Lecture Series, SUNY Stony Brook
 2000 – Present Member of Board of Directors of Comparative and Conservation Biology Foundation
 2000 – "Principal Investigator of the Year." Earthwatch Institute
 1998 – 2003 Member of International Society of Primatology Conservation Committee
 1995 – 1998 Advisory Board of Wenner-Gren Foundation for Anthropological Research
 1995 – "Chevalier d'Ordre National." National Medal of Honor of Madagascar, from the President of Madagascar
 1995 – Women in Science Engineering Annual Award, SUNY
 1994 – present Madagascar Faunal Group, International Board
 1994 – 2000 Scientific Advisory Board member of The Douroucouli Foundation
 1994 – present Advisory Board of Primate Conservation Inc.
 1994 – 1996 Advisory Board of the Center for Tropical Conservation, Duke University
 1994 – Women of the Year in Science Award, Three Village Times, New York
 1993 – 2001 Member of Board, Organization for Tropical Studies
 1993 – 1999 Member of Board of Trustees of The Nature Conservancy, Long Island Chapter
 1993 – Women Who Make a Difference Award, Family Circle Magazine
 1990 – present Member of the Editorial Board of the International Journal of Primatology
 1991 – present Member of External Advisory Board, Duke University Primate Center
 1991 – present IUCN Primate Specialists Group-Madagascar
 1990 – Honorary Doctor of Science Degree from Hood College
 1990 – 1991 Member of National Research Council Committee for Sustained Development & Environmental Preservation of Humid Tropics
 1989 – John D. and Catherine T. MacArthur Fellow
 1988 – 1994 Member of Conservation Committee for American Society of Primatologists
 1984 – present IUCN Primate Specialists Group-South America
 1982 – "S.L. Washburn Prize" for outstanding student paper at the American Association of Physical Anthropologists meeting, Eugene, Oregon

Media

TV and films
 2016 – featured on Anthony Bourdain: Parts Unknown, CNN
 2014 – featured in IMAX film Island of Lemurs: Madagascar
 2009 – featured on Dan Rather Reports, HDNet TV
 2002 – featured in David Attenborough's The Life of Mammals documentary film.
 2000 – Me & Isaac Newton, directed by Michael Apted, a Clear Blue Sky Production; Emmy award winner.

Print and radio features
 2009/10 – National Geographic Magazine
 2008/09 – BBC Natural History Unit (UK) and NHK Japan featured NSF Project
 2006 – featured in Smithsonian Magazine, April cover article "For the Love of Lemurs"
 2006 – interviewed in Award-winning National Public Radio show Life on Earth, Madagascar Biodiversity produced by Dan Grossman.
 2005 – Natural History Magazine June cover article "Dance of the Sexes"
 2005 – featured in Long Island Life, Newsday, February 206

Books
 2014 – For the Love of Lemurs: My Life in the Wilds of Madagascar published by Lantern Books 
 2013 –  High Moon Over the Amazon: My Quest to Understand the Monkeys of the Night published by Lantern Books 
 2011 – 
 2003 –

References

External links
 Centre ValBio
 Director Sharon Pieczenik's video interview
 PBS special on Wright's sifaka research
 Interview with Dr. Wright

1944 births
Living people
Hood College alumni
Harvard Medical School staff
Graduate Center, CUNY alumni
Duke University faculty
Stony Brook University faculty
MacArthur Fellows
Women primatologists
People from Doylestown, Pennsylvania
Conservation biologists
Primatologists